is a fictional character and the protagonist of the Fist of the North Star manga series created by Tetsuo Hara and Buronson. According to Hara and Buronson, Kenshiro's character design was primarily based on the martial artist and actor Bruce Lee, combined with influences from actor Yūsaku Matsuda and the Mad Max film series.

In the story, Kenshiro is the rightful successor of an ancient art of assassination called Hokuto Shinken, which allows Kenshiro to defeat his adversaries through use of hidden meridian points. Through the course of the original manga, Kenshiro fights against various ruffians who threaten the lives of the post-apocalyptic survivors, as well as numerous rival martial artists, including his three honorary brothers trained in the art of Hokuto Shinken.

Concept and creation

Artist Tetsuo Hara was a fan of Chinese martial artist Bruce Lee as well as action manga and the Japanese action film star Yūsaku Matsuda. He combined the appearance and character traits of Bruce Lee and Yūsaku Matsuda when he came up with the character design of Kenshiro.

Hara originally depicted Kenshiro as a teenager who fought against the rival martial arts school of the Taizanji Kenpō in the 1980s Japan in his two-part prototype version of Hokuto no Ken. In this setting, Kenshiro was the 23rd successor of Hokuto Shinken, preceded by his unnamed father, who in turn learned the art from the 21st successor, Master . This Kenshiro was much more cheerful than the Kenshiro of the serialized manga, having yet to experience the same hardships at the start of the story and lacking his iconic seven scars. After Kenshiro's girlfriend, Yuki is murdered and Ken is framed for her death, Kenshiro becomes a wanted fugitive who sets out to overthrow the Taizanji organization. The character was revised by Buronson when Hokuto no Ken was picked up for weekly serialization. Now turned into a full-grown adult, Buronson has stated that he based the revised Kenshiro primarily on the actor and martial arts legend Bruce Lee. He also cites the Mad Max film series as an influence. The character is only referred by his given name in the series, which is always written in katakana in Japanese. The full name Kenshiro Kasumi was reused for the main character of Fist of the Blue Sky, a predecessor of the Kenshiro from Fist of the North Star, although his given name is spelled differently ( instead of ).

Character overview
Kenshiro is the youngest of four adopted sons trained by the previous Hokuto Shinken successor, Ryuken. As a child, he was sent to Japan, along with his future nemesis Raoh and Raoh's brother Toki, to escape from their homeland, the war-torn Land of Asura. Along with Raoh, Toki and a fourth student named Jagi, Kenshiro, the youngest of the four, was trained in the art of Hokuto Shinken and eventually named successor by Ryuken. After surviving the nuclear war, he tried to live in peace with his fiancée Yulia, until Jagi instigates Shin, a jealous rival from the Nanto Koshuken school, to challenge, then defeat Kenshiro. Shin then engraved the iconic seven scars on Kenshiro's chest by stabbing Kenshiro with his fingertips and left him for dead. Prior to this event, he was more forgiving of his enemies, as shown in a flashback of Jagi's failed assassination attempt against him, in which Kenshiro chooses to spare Jagi's life after defeating him. When Kenshiro later fights his old rivals in the present, particularly Shin, Jagi, and Raoh, they all remark on Kenshiro's acquired mercilessness.

The initial story arc centers around Kenshiro's quest to reclaim Yulia from Shin. He meets a pair of orphans who follow him in his journey: Bat, a thief; and Lin, a young girl rescued by Ken. Throughout the course of the series, Kenshiro protects the weak and innocent from the numerous gangs roaming the post-apocalyptic wasteland, eventually gaining his reputation as the "Savior of the Century's End." Kenshiro's skills improve through his encounters with members of the Nanto Roku Seiken and his Hokuto brothers. In the intervening years between Kenshiro last encountering his brothers, Toki decided to use his powers in a way that brought no pain, through healing and painless attacks, while Raoh became considerably more misguided, intent on becoming the 'Conqueror of the Century's End' through ruling the wasteland with an iron fist. Kenshiro eventually confronts and defeats Raoh and is reunited with Yulia, and lives with her until she eventually dies from a terminal illness brought on by radiation sickness.

Years later, Kenshiro joins forces with the now-grown Bat and Lin, who have formed the Hokuto Army to fight off the now-corrupt Gento Kōken warriors. The story eventually takes Ken to the Land of Asura, where he learns of his Hokuto Sōke heritage and fights against the warlords who control the Land of Asura: his estranged blood brother Hyoh; and Kaioh, Raoh's other blood brother. In the end, Kenshiro takes Raoh's orphaned son, Ryu, under his wing, before continuing on his own, the future of humanity finally sealed with the defeat of Kaioh.

Voice actors
Kenshiro has been voiced by numerous voice actors in different media. Akira Kamiya voiced him first in the original anime television series and movie, as well as in a few video games. He is voiced by Takehito Koyasu in the original video animation series New Fist of the North Star, Kunihiro Kawamoto in the Fist of the North Star arcade game and CGI short Hokuto no Ken: Legend of Heroes, Hiroshi Abe in The Legends of the True Savior film series, Hideo Ishikawa in the video game version of Ten no Haō, Katsuyuki Konishi in the video games Fist of the North Star: Ken's Rage, J-Stars Victory VS, Jump Force and Fitness Boxing: Fist of the North Star, and Takaya Kuroda and Robbie Daymond in the video game Fist of the North Star: Lost Paradise. The child version of Kenshiro is voiced by Ryō Horikawa in the original anime series and by Yūko Gibu in the Legends of the True Savior film series.

Reception
In a survey conducted by the Oricon in 2007 among 1,000 people, Kenshiro ranked third place as the "strongest manga character of all time," behind only Dragon Ball protagonist Son Goku and Doraemon who ranked first and second, respectively.

A "wedding ceremony" for Kenshiro and Yuria was held at the Nippon Seinenkan on September 13, 2008, the date of the 25th anniversary of Fist of the North Star. Tetsuo Hara, Buronson, and other staff who worked on the series attended the ceremony planned by an actual wedding planner, 3,000 fans were applying for the 777 invitations that were available to fans via various outlets.

Internet memes
In the 2010s, Kenshiro's catchphrase "Omae Wa Mou Shindeiru" ("You Are Already Dead") became a popular Internet meme. In September 2017, music producer deadman 死人 (Noah Ryan Murphy) released the song "Omae Wa Mou" which references the meme and samples the Japanese song "Tiny Little Adiantum" (2013) from the Touhou Project video game music album Toho Bossa Nova 2. Rapper Lil Boom produced his own version of the song called "Already Dead" three months later. In 2019, "Omae Wa Mou" went viral on TikTok and topped Spotify's Viral 50 chart, before being taken off the chart after being struck with a copyright claim.  In 2022, game publisher Wizards of the Coast featured a playing card titled "You Are Already Dead" in its new Japanese-themed Magic: The Gathering set, Kamigawa: Neon Dynasty.

See also
Bruceploitation

References

External links

Ansatsuken
Adoptee characters in anime and manga
Anime and manga characters with superhuman strength
Anime and manga characters who can move at superhuman speeds
Martial artist characters in anime and manga
Bruceploitation characters
Fictional male martial artists
Fictional nunchakuka
Fictional characters with energy-manipulation abilities
Fictional characters with extrasensory perception
Fictional characters with superhuman durability or invulnerability
Fictional characters with superhuman senses
Male characters in anime and manga
Orphan characters in anime and manga
Comics characters introduced in 1983
Fist of the North Star
Internet memes
Internet memes introduced in the 2010s
Vigilante characters in comics